William Cole Cozzens (August 26, 1811 – December 17, 1876) was an American politician and the 28th Governor of Rhode Island.

Early life
Cozzens was born in Newport, Rhode Island on August 26, 1811.

He married Martha Stanton Gould; the couple had five children. He was a successful dry goods businessman and President of the Rhode Island Union Bank.

Political career
Cozzens was a Democrat. He was a mayor of Newport and represented Newport in both houses of the Rhode Island General Assembly. He was president of the state Senate and thus became governor of Rhode Island on March 3, 1863, when William Sprague resigned to become a US Senator. Cozzens ran in the next gubernatorial election, but lost to Republican James Y. Smith and left office on May 26, 1863.  (Normally the lieutenant governor of Rhode Island would become governor in the event of the governor's resignation; however, at that time the office of lieutenant governor was vacant due to the resignation in December 1862 of Lieutenant Governor Samuel G. Arnold to become a United States Senator.)

Death
He died on December 17, 1876 and was interred at the Island Cemetery in Newport.

His great-grandson, James Gould Cozzens, was a Pulitzer Prize-winning novelist.

Sources

 Sobel, Robert and John Raimo. Biographical Directory of the Governors of the United States, 1789–1978. Greenwood Press, 1988.

External links

References

|-

1811 births
1876 deaths
Democratic Party governors of Rhode Island
Mayors of Newport, Rhode Island
Union (American Civil War) state governors
Burials in Rhode Island
19th-century American politicians